is a video game compilation developed and published by Namco Bandai Games for the Xbox 360. It was released in North America in 2008 and in Europe and Japan in 2009. Part of its Namco Museum series, Virtual Arcade includes 34 titles; nine of these are Namco Bandai-published Xbox Live Arcade games, and the rest are arcade games that are only accessible through the disc. Players can access the Xbox Live Arcade games through their dashboard if the disc is in the console.

Games
Namco Museum Virtual Arcade is a compilation of video games published by Namco and its successor, Namco Bandai Games. The collection contains 34 games that encompass a variety of genres, including maze chasers, shoot 'em ups, and platformers. It is divided into two sets of games that can be selected in the in-game menu. The first set contains nine Namco Bandai-published games for Xbox Live Arcade, which in addition to being selectable through the main menu can also be accessed through the Xbox 360's dashboard, as long as the disc is in the console. Some of these are ports of arcade games like Pac-Man (1980) and Xevious (1983), while others such as Pac-Man Championship Edition (2007) are brand-new sequels with different gameplay structures and mechanics. These Xbox Live Arcade games also contain achievements and online leaderboards. The second set of games are only available on the disc, and include 22 Namco arcade games from the 1970s and 1980s as well as three "Arrangement" remakes of Pac-Man, Galaga (1981), and Dig Dug (1982). Players can modify in-game settings such as controller inputs, difficulty, and the starting number of lives. This would also be the last time Ms. Pac-Man (1982) would be included in a Namco Museum, as future reissues were strictly standalone or on dedicated minicades.

Development and release
Namco Museum Virtual Arcade was developed and published by Namco Bandai Games for the Xbox 360. Its development was handled by the company's North American division, with its marketing director Todd Thorson serving as the project director. Virtual Arcade was designed to be the largest and most comprehensive in Namco Museum line of compilations, in addition to serving as a convenient and affordable way for consumers to play its back catalog. The collection is the first Namco Museum to include Sky Kid Deluxe (1986), which had previously been rereleased in Japan through Namco Collection Vol. 1 (1999) for Windows. The three Arrangement games were taken from the PlayStation Portable game Namco Museum Battle Collection (2005), and were upscaled and modified to support high definition video and improved sound. Pac-Man Championship Edition, Galaga Legions, and Mr. Driller Online were added to the lineup to represent the company's ability to produce well-designed followups to its older arcade games.

Namco Bandai Games announced Virtual Arcade at the 2008 Electronic Entertainment Expo (E3), and released it in North America on November 4, 2008. The game was later released in Europe on May 15, 2009, in Australia on May 21, 2009, and in Japan on November 5, 2009. In the European version, Metro-Cross is renamed Retro-Cross.

Reception

According to the review aggregator website Metacritic, Namco Museum Virtual Arcade received "mixed or average reviews", holding a 63/100 on the site. It sold 5,912 copies in Japan by the end of 2009, making it one of the worst-selling Namco Museum games in the country.

Critics were generally pleased with the selection of games. Steve Hannley, a reviewer for GamesRadar+, wrote: "For the right buyer, this is a gleaming golden treasure even with bits of tarnish here and there." Out of the included titles, Pac-Man Championship Edition and Galaga Legions were considered the highlights of the package. Jeuxvideo.com author Pixelpirate recommended Virtual Arcade for those games alone. The inclusion of Namco Bandai's Xbox Live Arcade library was also met with praise, and critics said this helped make the collection worth the purchase. Among the Museum games, critics found Dragon Spirit, Pole Position, and Metro-Cross to be some of the standouts. GameSpots Don Francis felt the library relied too heavily on Pac-Man games, but possessed a good selection of titles regardless. Writing for IGN, Ryan Geddes pointed out that most of the games were included in past Namco Museum collections, and said those are likely worth seeking out instead of Virtual Arcade.

The collection drew largely negative responses towards its presentation. The menu layout was criticized for being needlessly complicated and making it difficult to navigate through the different libraries. Francis and a reviewer for Retro Gamer showed frustration towards this menu as hindering what is otherwise a well-made compilation. Pixelpirate similarly found the menu difficult to use, but praised its minimalist art style and background music. The lack of included extras was criticized by Geddes, who unfavorably compared it to collections like Activision Anthology that contained additional content like developer interviews and artwork scans. Some also disliked the controls for certain games, though they attributed this to the poor quality of the Xbox 360's directional pad and not the pack itself.

Notes

References

External links

2008 video games
Bandai Namco games
Bandai Namco video game compilations
Xbox 360 games
Xbox 360 Live Arcade compilations